15th FAI World Precision Flying Championship took place between July 7 - July 14, 2002 in Zagreb in Croatia.

Uczestnicy
There were 54 competitors from Czech Republic (5), Poland (5), Croatia (5), South Africa (5), Austria (5), Russia (5), France (4), Slovakia (4), Germany (3), Denmark (3), Slovenia (2), United Kingdom (2), Cyprus (2), Sweden (1), Norway (1), Switzerland (1), Turkey (1).

Most popular airplane was Cessna 150 (19 pilots), then Cessna 152 (15), Cessna 172 (10), Zlin Z-43 (3), A-27M/MC (3), PZL-104M Wilga 2000 (2), PZL-104 Wilga 35 (1), Piper PA-18 (1). Numbers of aircraft participating were lower, because many pilots flew the same aircraft.

Results

Individual

Team 
Counted three best pilots (number of penal points and place)
 - 855 pts
 Lubos Hajek - 144 pts, #1,
 Jiří Filip - 330 pts, #6,
 Michal Filip - 381 pts, #10 
 - 909 pts 
 Janusz Darocha - 253 pts, #2
 Krzysztof Wieczorek - 312 pts, #4,
 Wacław Wieczorek - 344 pts, #7
 - 1544 pts
 Predrag Crnko - 297 pts, #3,
 Želimir Trifunović - 365 pts, #8,
 Andrej Bagar - 882 pts, #27
 - 2076 pts
 Nigel Hopkins - 321 pts, #5
 Adrian Pilling - 565 pts, #15
 Barry De Groot - 1190 pts, #32
 - 2322 pts
 - 2547 pts
 - 3214 pts
 - 5529 pts
 - 5673 pts
 - 7926 pts

References

15th FAI World Precision Flying Championship
 Jiří DODAL:  TRIUMF ČESKÝCH PILOTŮ V ZAGREBU (retrieved on 9-8-2008)

See also
14th FAI World Precision Flying Championship
16th FAI World Precision Flying Championship

Precision Flying 15
FAI World Precision Flying Championship
FAI World Precision Flying Championship
FAI World Precision Flying Championship, 2002
Fédération Aéronautique Internationale
Aviation history of Croatia